Paranjothi Easwarar Temple is a Hindu temple dedicated to the deity Shiva, located at Thanjakkoor in Sivagangai district, Tamil Nadu, India.

Vaippu Sthalam
It is one of the shrines of the Vaippu Sthalams sung by Tamil Saivite Nayanar Sundarar. This place is also known as Adhi Vilvavana Kshetra, referring to the age old place which had many vilva trees.

Presiding deity
The presiding deity in the garbhagriha, represented by the lingam, is known as Paranjothi Easwarar. The Goddess is known as Gnanambikai. He is also known as Rudrakodeeswarar.

Specialities
This is the birth place of Poyyamozhi Pulavar who sung Thanjaivanan Kovai. Parvati, Vinayaka, Murugan, Lakshmi, Rama, Lakshmana, Hanuman, Laksmi, Saraswati, Agastya, Indrani and Gautama Maharishi worshipped the presiding deity.  On the request of Brahma, Vishnu and Indra the deity blessed them.

Structure 
The temple do not have a compound wall. It has sanctum sanctorum and one front mandapa. The shrine of the presiding deity is facing east, while the Goddess is facing south. Arrangements are on the anvil for the construction of the gopura. Next to the entrance Dwajasthambam and bali peetam, are found. Next to bali peetam Navagraha shrine is found. On either side of the sanctum sanctorum Dvarapalas are found. At the right of the sanctum sanctorum Vinayaka is found. No other shrines or sculptures are found in this temple.

Location
The temple is located in Madurai-Ramanathapuram/Manamadurai bus route, next to Thiruppuvanam and Tiruppachetti at a distance of 5 km in Thanjakkoor. It is opened for devotees from 8.00 am to 10.00 and 4.00 pm to 7.00 pm.

References

Hindu temples in Sivaganga district
Shiva temples in Sivaganga district